Taali  is a village in Tori Parish, Pärnu County in southwestern Estonia.

Taali manor
Taali manor derives its name from the family Staël von Holstein, who received the estate as a gift in the 17th century and who were the owners until the Estonian land reform of 1919. The present-day limestone building, in neo-Renaissance style, was built in 1852 but heavily damaged during World War II. Today only about one third of the original building remains.

References

Villages in Pärnu County
Manor houses in Estonia